Sarotorna eridora is a moth of the family Gelechiidae. It was described by Edward Meyrick in 1904. It is found in Australia, where it has been recorded from New South Wales.

The forewings are ochreous white with four moderate dark fuscous fasciae, the first subbasal, the second and third confluent on the costa in the middle, running to the middle of the dorsum and tornus respectively, the fourth from the costa before the apex to the termen. The hindwings are rather dark fuscous, lighter anteriorly.

References

Moths described in 1904
Sarotorna